Traditional Vietnamese martial arts (Võ thuật Cổ truyền Việt Nam; Chữ Hán: 武術古傳越南) often referred to as Võ thuật (Chữ Hán: 武術), can be loosely divided into those of the Sino-Vietnamese descended from the Han, and the Chams or indigenous Vietnamese.

Traditional schools
 Võ thuật Bình Định/Bình Định Gia umbrella title for all the traditional styles of Bình Định in central Vietnam.
 Võ Lâm Tân Khánh Bà Trà - The Tân Khánh martial arts was established in the 17th century.  It was developed as a method of self-defense against enemies and wild animals. 
 Traditional Vietnamese wrestling.

Modern schools
Modern styles, or Phái (schools), include:

 Nhất Nam
 Vovinam Founded by Nguyễn Lộc. Also called Vovinam Việt Võ Đạo (Việt = Vietnamese, Võ = martial, Đạo = way)
 Võ Việt Nam (Cuton) or Võ Đạo of Phạm Văn Tan.
Vietnamese Wing Chun - a style of Wing Chun founded by Yuen Chai-wan. 

Overseas
 Cuong Nhu of Ngô Đồng (d. Florida 2000), known also by the Japanese title O Sensei.
 Qwan Ki Do, founded in France.
 Tam Qui Khi-Kong, now popular in Russia.
 Traditional Vietnamese wrestling.

Terminology
 võ sư master
 võ phục tunic
 võ kinh  martial arts scripture
 Bắc Việt võ Northern Vietnam style
 quyền fist, such as Hùng kê quyền, Hồng Gia quyền, Lão mai quyền
 võ thuật Bình Định martial arts of Bình Định
 Đấu vật ring wrestling (can also mean western wrestling)
 Hand techniques (đòn tay)
 Elbow techniques (chỏ)
 Kicking techniques (đá)
 Knee techniques (gối)
 Forms (Quyền, Song Luyện, Đa Luyện)
 Attack techniques (chiến lược)
 Traditional wrestling (Vật cổ truyền)
 Leg Attack take-downs (đòn chân tấn công)
 Staff (côn)
 Sword (kiếm)
 Halberd (dao dài, "long knife")
 Rope dart/chain whip (nhuyễn tiên, different from Chinese rope dart)
 khăn rằn - The khan ran is a southern scarf that originated from the Khmer krama scarf.  The khan ran can be used to lock the enemy's arm, lock the enemy's wrist, lock the enemy's leg, pull the enemy's leg and to attack the enemy's face.

See also
 Indochinese martial arts

References